Katherine Faw (born July 17, 1983), formerly Katherine Faw Morris, is an American writer. Young God, her debut novel, was long-listed for the Flaherty-Dunnan First Novel Prize and named a best book of the year by The Times Literary Supplement, The Houston Chronicle, and BuzzFeed.

In The Guardian, Eimear McBride wrote Young God was "likely to leave even the sturdiest stunned." Elle called it "seductive … Reading Young God is like having a bottle rocket go off in your hands."
Faw was born in Wilkesboro, North Carolina. She lives in Brooklyn, New York.

Publications
Young God. Farrar, Straus and Giroux. 2014.
Ultraluminous. MCD/Farrar, Straus and Giroux. 2017.

References

External links
 

1983 births
Living people
21st-century American writers
21st-century American women writers